Spain competed at the 2011 World Championships in Athletics from August 27 to September 4 in Daegu, South Korea.

Team selection

The Royal Spanish Athletics Federation announced a squad of 49 athletes to compete at the event.  The team will be led by medal hopefuls 
Manuel Olmedo, the reigning European indoor 1500m champion, and 
Mario Pestano, who is in 4th position on this year’s Discus Throw world
list.

The following athletes appeared on the preliminary Entry List, but not on the Official Start List of the specific event, resulting in a total number of 43 competitors:

Medalists
The following competitors from South Africa won medals at the Championships

Results

Men

Women

References

External links
Official local organising committee website
Official IAAF competition website

Nations at the 2011 World Championships in Athletics
World Championships in Athletics
Spain at the World Championships in Athletics